Kissing to Be Clever is the debut album by the English band Culture Club, released on 
4 October 1982 in the United Kingdom. It includes Culture Club's international breakthrough hit single, "Do You Really Want to Hurt Me", which reached number one in the band's native UK and the top 10 of many charts around the world. The album has reportedly sold over 4 million copies worldwide, including over 1 million in the US where it has been certified Platinum by the RIAA.

Overview
The album's first two singles were "White Boy" (which failed to crack the US or UK charts), and "I'm Afraid of Me" (which peaked at No. 100 in the UK). But with the release of "Do You Really Want to Hurt Me", the band scored a number one hit in over a dozen countries, and the song also hit the top 10 in several other countries including number two in the U.S. The album itself spent 88 weeks on the US Billboard chart, reaching its peak position of number 14 in March 1983 in the US. The follow-up single, "Time (Clock of the Heart)", became a US number two and UK top three hit. This song appeared on the US version of the album but not initially on the UK version. Another single was released in North America, "I'll Tumble 4 Ya", which became the group's third consecutive top 10 single in the US. This gave Culture Club the distinction of being the first band since The Beatles to have three top 10 hits from a debut album in the US.

Kissing to Be Clever was remastered and re-released in 2003 on CD. This edition contains the song "Romance Beyond the Alphabet", which is the orchestral instrumental version of "Time (Clock of the Heart), also included on Culture Club Collect – 12" Mixes Plus and its subsequent re-release Culture Club Remix Collection as "Time (Clock of the Heart) (Instrumental Mix)". The 2003 release of the album has the restoration of the original colour cover which had been replaced by a black-and-white picture of lead singer Boy George on previous versions.

Reception

Reviews for Kissing to Be Clever have been generally positive. AllMusic's Lindsay Planer noted that it "was embraced by not only post-disco dance music enthusiasts, but also new wave listeners and pop fans as well." She also stated that the singles "provide accurate thumbnail sketches of what Culture Club were capable of pulling off musically." She concluded by saying: "From the light and buoyant Philly soul-inspired string arrangement to the effervescent and singalongable chorus, the melody foreshadowed a similar vibe that would carry over to their sophomore long-player, Colour by Numbers."

Robert Christgau of The Village Voice wrote that "for all [Culture Club's] fashionability I think their hearts are in the right place". However, he stated that "their bland Caribbean rhythms move no muscles, and their confrontations with racial issues are rarely more than a phrase deep." Lloyd Sachs of Rolling Stone stated that the album "positively jumps, from the pleasure-seeking masochism of "Do You Really Want to Hurt Me?" to the fearful soul-searching of "I'm Afraid of Me" to the shady "I'll Tumble 4 Ya"". He further stated that "[Boy George's] vocal "normalcy" [plays] against the provocative content of the material." He concluded that "the beat does special service to the message – even when we don't quite know what that message is."

Track listing
All tracks written by Culture Club.

International issue (Virgin)
 "White Boy" [Dance Mix] – 4:40
 "You Know I'm Not Crazy" – 3:36
 "I'll Tumble 4 Ya" – 2:36
 "Take Control" – 3:09
 "Love Twist" [Featuring Captain Crucial] – 4:23
 "Boy Boy (I'm the Boy)" – 3:50
 "I'm Afraid of Me" [Remix] – 3:16
 "White Boys Can't Control It" – 3:43
 "Do You Really Want to Hurt Me" – 4:22

2003 reissue bonus tracks
 "Love Is Cold (You Were Never No Good)" – 4:24
 "Murder Rap Trap" – 4:23
 "Time (Clock of the Heart)" – 3:45
 "Romance Beyond the Alphabet" – 3:49

American issue (Epic)
Side one
 "Do You Really Want to Hurt Me" – 4:22
 "I'm Afraid of Me" [Remix] – 3:16
 "You Know I'm Not Crazy" – 3:36
 "I'll Tumble 4 Ya" – 2:36
 "Love Twist" [Featuring Captain Crucial] – 4:23

Side two
 "Time (Clock of the Heart)" – 3:41 (not on original pressings)
 "White Boy" [Dance Mix] – 4:40
 "Boy Boy (I'm the Boy)" – 3:50
 "White Boys Can't Control It" – 3:43
 "Take Control" – 3:09

In an unusual move, Epic in the US added two tracks to the cassette version of the album: "Do You Really Want To Hurt Me (Dub Version, Featuring – Pappa Weasel)" at the end of side 1, and "Romance Beyond the Alphabet", which is the instrumental version of "Time (Clock of the Heart)" at the end of side 2. 

Later American cassette reissues of this album follow the UK track listing.

Personnel

Culture Club
Boy George – vocals
Michael Craig – bass
Roy Hay – guitar, piano, keyboards, sitar, electric sitar
Jon Moss – percussion, drums

Additional musicians
Keith Miller – Synclavier
Terry Bailey – trumpet
Colin Campsie – background vocals
Nicky Payne – flute, harmonica, saxophone
Denise Spooner – background vocals
Helen Terry – backing vocals
Phil Pickett – keyboards, background vocals
Trevor Bastow – strings arrangement

Production
Steve Levine – producer, engineer
Gordon Milne – assistant engineer, mixing
Jon Moss – mixing, drum programming
Keith Miller – Synclavier programming
Jik Graham – cover design, logo, typography
Andy Phillips  - photography
Mark Lebon – photography
Jackie Ball – artwork
Nick Egan – logo

Charts

Weekly charts

Year-end charts

Singles

Certifications and sales

Release details

References

External links
 Amazon.com review
 Artist Direct review
 Buy.com review
 Rate Your Music review

1982 debut albums
Culture Club albums
Virgin Records albums
Albums produced by Steve Levine